Chares is the name of three prominent ancient Greeks:

Chares of Athens - a 4th-century BC general;
Chares of Mytilene - a historian who lived at the court of Alexander the Great;
Chares of Lindos - a sculptor who created the Colossus of Rhodes

A chare may also be:
Chare - a dialect term in north-east England for an alleyway

See also

Charls